HMS K9 was a K class submarine built by Vickers, Barrow-in-Furness. K9 was laid down on 28 June 1915. She was commissioned on 9 May 1917. In 1921, K9 was placed in reserve. K9 was sold in Charlestown on 23 July 1926.

Design
Like all British K-class submarines, K9 had a displacement of  when at the surface and  while submerged. The submarine was powered by two oil-fired Yarrow Shipbuilders boilers and one geared Brown-Curtis or Parsons steam turbine; this developed 10,500 ship horsepower (7,800 kW) to drive two  screws. It also contained four electric motors each producing . It was also fitted with a diesel engine providing  to be used when steam was being raised, or instead of raising steam.

K9 was fitted with a  anti-aircraft gun, ten  torpedo tubes, and two  deck guns. Its torpedo tubes were fitted to the bows, the midship section, and two were mounted on the deck. Its complement was fifty-nine crew members.

References

Bibliography
 

 

Ships built in Barrow-in-Furness
British K-class submarines
Royal Navy ship names
1916 ships